Brian Robert Boyd Magee (4 May 1918 – May 2006) was a Canadian cricketer.  Magee was a left-handed batsman who bowled left-arm medium pace.  He was born in Toronto, Ontario.

Educated at Radley College in Oxfordshire, England, Magee made a single first-class appearance for Canada in 1954 against Yorkshire at North Marine Road Ground, Scarborough during Canada's 1954 tour of England.  In Canada's first-innings, he scored 3 runs before being dismissed by Fred Trueman and in their second-innings he scored 13 runs before being dismissed by Johnny Wardle.  With the ball he took a single wicket, that of England Test cricketer Willie Watson.  In Canada, he also played three matches for Ontario between 1949 and 1952, all against Manitoba.  None of these matches held first-class status.

He died in May 2006, in the city of his birth.

References

External links
Brian Magee at ESPNcricinfo
Brian Magee at CricketArchive

1918 births
2006 deaths
Sportspeople from Toronto
People educated at Radley College
Canadian cricketers
Cricketers from Ontario